Lagokarpos is an extinct plant genus from the Late Paleocene to early Middle Eocene of North America, Germany and China. Its relationship with modern taxa is unclear.

Etymology
Lago- is from lagós(λαγώς) which means "hare" and karpos is from karpós(καρπός) which means "fruit". The name refers to its rabbit-eared wings.

References 

Prehistoric angiosperm genera
Angiosperms
Paleocene plants
Eocene plants